Olanrewaju Durodola (born 16 October 1980) is a Nigerian professional boxer who has held the African cruiserweight title since February 2020, and previously the WBC Silver cruiserweight title from 2015 to 2016. As an amateur he competed at the 2008 Summer Olympics and 2009 World Championships, both at heavyweight.

Career
In his only previous major event he suffered a 29:29 countback loss to Camille Michel of Seychelles at the 2006 Commonwealth Games.

The 1.92/6'3' Durodola did not compete at the 2007 All-Africa Games but qualified at the 2nd AIBA African 2008 Olympic Qualifying Tournament by beating among others Awusone Yekeni.

He lost his only Olympic match to Cuban Osmay Acosta, Acosta went on further to win a bronze medal.

He is noted for his knockout power, even in the amateurs, having stopped the vast majority of his opponents.

In 2011, Durodola has turned professional.  His first professional bout was scheduled for 19 February at Memorial Hall in Kansas City, Kansas, but that fight was canceled when his opponent withdrew from the fight at the last minute.
As of 2013, Durodola won the WBC Continentals Americas Cruiser Weight Championship title and WBC Silver Cruiserweight champion.

Professional boxing record 

|-
| style="text-align:center;" colspan=9|42 fights, 34 wins (31 knockouts), 8 losses
|-  style="text-align:center; background:#e3e3e3;"
! Number
! Result
! Record
! Opponent
! Type
! Rd., Time
! Date
! Location
! Notes
|-
|42
|Loss
|34–8
|style="text-align:left;"| Richard Riakporhe
|
|
|
|style="text-align:left;"| 
|style="text-align:left;"|
|-
|41
|Win
|34–7
|style="text-align:left;"| Olarewaju Segun
|
|
|
|style="text-align:left;"| 
|style="text-align:left;"|
|-
|40
|Win
|33–7
|style="text-align:left;"| Abraham Tabul
|
|
|
|style="text-align:left;"| 
|style="text-align:left;"|
|-
|39
|Win
|32–7
|style="text-align:left;"| Vikapita Meroro
|
|
|
|style="text-align:left;"| 
|style="text-align:left;"|
|-
|38
|Win
|31–7
|style="text-align:left;"| Kabiru Towolawi
|
|
|
|style="text-align:left;"| 
|style="text-align:left;"|
|-
|37
|Win
|30–7
|style="text-align:left;"| Michael Godwin
|
|
|
|style="text-align:left;"| 
|style="text-align:left;"|
|-
|36
|Loss
|29–7
|style="text-align:left;"| Michał Cieślak
|
|
|
|style="text-align:left;"| 
|style="text-align:left;"|
|-
|35
|Win
|29–6
|style="text-align:left;"| Maroy Sadiki
|
|
|
|style="text-align:left;"| 
|style="text-align:left;"|
|-
|34
|Win
|28–6
|style="text-align:left;"| Jackson Dos Santos
|
|
|
|style="text-align:left;"| 
|style="text-align:left;"|
|-
|33
|Loss
|27–6
|style="text-align:left;"| Krzysztof Włodarczyk
|
|
|
|style="text-align:left;"| 
|style="text-align:left;"|
|-
|32
|Loss
|27–5
|style="text-align:left;"| Maxim Vlasov
|
|
|
|style="text-align:left;"| 
|style="text-align:left;"|
|-
|31
|Win
|27–4
|style="text-align:left;"| Maroy Sadiki
|
|
|
|style="text-align:left;"| 
|style="text-align:left;"|
|-
|30
|Win
|26–4
|style="text-align:left;"| Karama Nyilawila
|
|
|
|style="text-align:left;"| 
|style="text-align:left;"|
|-
|29
|Loss
|25–4
|style="text-align:left;"| Dmitry Kudryashov
|
|
|
|style="text-align:left;"| 
|style="text-align:left;"|
|-
|28
|Win
|25–3
|style="text-align:left;"| Mussa Ajibu
|
||
|
|style="text-align:left;"| 
|align=left|
|-
|27
|Win
|24–3
|style="text-align:left;"| Pascal Ndomba
|
|
|
|style="text-align:left;"| 
|style="text-align:left;"|
|-
|26
|Win
|23–3
|align=left| Yuberti Suarez Diaz
|
|
|
|align=left| 
|align=left|
|-
|25
|Loss
|22–3
|align=left| Mairis Briedis
|
|9 (12)
|
|align=left|
|align=left|
|-
|24
|Win
|22–2
|align=left| Dmitry Kudryashov
|
|
|
|align=left|
|align=left|
|-
|23
|Win
|21–2
|align=left| Paakwesi Ankrah
|
|
|
|align=left|
|align=left|
|-
|22
|Win
|20–2
|align=left| Walter David Cabral
|
|
|
|align=left|
|align=left|
|-
|21
|Win
|19–2
|align=left| Joell Godfrey
|
|
|
|align=left|
|align=left|
|-
|20
|Win
|18–2
|align=left| Max Heyman
|
|
|
|align=left|
|align=left|
|-
|19
|Loss
|17–2
|align=left| Thabiso Mchunu
|
|
|
|align=left|
|align=left|
|-
|18
|Win
|17–1
|align=left| Mitch Williams
|
|
|
|align=left|
|align=left|
|-
|17
|Win
|16–1
|align=left| Harvey Jolly
|
|
|
|align=left|
|align=left|
|-
|16
|Win
|15–1
|align=left| Victor Barragan
|
|
|
|align=left|
|align=left|
|-
|15
|Win
|14–1
|align=left| Shannon Miller
|
|
|
|align=left|
|align=left|
|-
|14
|Win
|13–1
|align=left| Billy Cunningham
|
|
|
|align=left|
|align=left|
|-
|13
|Win
|12–1
|align=left| Aduku Nsor
|
|
|
|align=left|
|align=left|
|-
|12
|Win
|11–1
|align=left| Ibrahim Marshall
|
|
|
|align=left|
|align=left|
|-
|11
|Win
|10–1
|align=left| Sam Hill
|
|
|
|align=left|
|align=left|
|-
|10
|Loss
|9–1
|align=left| Akhror Muralimov
|
|
|
|align=left|
|align=left|
|-
|9
|Win
|9–0
|align=left| Calvin Rooks
|
|
|
|align=left|
|align=left|
|-
|8
|Win
|8–0
|align=left| Maron Jackson
|
|
|
|align=left|
|align=left|
|-
|7
|Win
|7–0
|align=left| Joseph Rabotte
|
|
|
|align=left|
|align=left|
|-
|6
|Win
|6–0
|align=left| Lance Gauch
|
|
|
|align=left|
|align=left|
|-
|5
|Win
|5–0
|align=left| Dione Craig
|
|
|
|align=left|
|align=left|
|-
|4
|Win
|4–0
|align=left| Jason Massie
|
|
|
|align=left|
|align=left|
|-
|3
|Win
|3–0
|align=left| Benjamin Cantwell
|
|
|
|align=left|
|align=left|
|-
|2
|Win
|2–0
|align=left| Jamal Woods
|
|
|
|align=left|
|align=left|
|-
|1
|Win
|1–0
|align=left| John Blanchard
|
|
|
|align=left|
|align=left|
|- align=center
|}

References

External links
Data
Olympic qualifier

1980 births
Living people
Yoruba sportspeople
Cruiserweight boxers
Heavyweight boxers
African Boxing Union champions
Boxers at the 2006 Commonwealth Games
Olympic boxers of Nigeria
Boxers at the 2008 Summer Olympics
Nigerian male boxers
Commonwealth Games competitors for Nigeria
People from Abuja